Best Fake Friends is a 2016 American drama film directed by Paul Kampf and starring Lauren Bowles, Max Ryan, Victoria Smurfit, Suleka Mathew, Michelle Arthur, Kiowa Gordon and Sid Mallya.

Cast
Lauren Bowles as Joy
Max Ryan as Mark Dillon
Victoria Smurfit as Nikki
Suleka Mathew as Tory
Michelle Arthur as Rachel
Jessica Belkin as Emily Dillon
Kiowa Gordon as William
Tara Perry as Sandra
Sid Mallya as Vin

Reception
Steve Rubenstein of The Seattle Times gave the film zero stars out of four.

References

External links
 
 

American drama films
2010s English-language films
2010s American films